Dirk Kaesler (born in Wiesbaden on 19 October 1944 as Dirk Käsler) is a German sociologist and Max Weber expert. Now retired, he was formerly Professor of Sociology at the University of Marburg. He is the author of Max Weber: An Introduction to his Life and Work, first published by the University of Chicago Press in 1988.

References

German sociologists
1944 births
Living people
German male writers